Ismo Villa (8 November 1954 – 18 November 2014) was a Finnish ice hockey player. He competed in the men's tournament at the 1980 Winter Olympics.

References

External links
 

1954 births
2014 deaths
Olympic ice hockey players of Finland
Ice hockey players at the 1980 Winter Olympics
People from Rauma, Finland
Sportspeople from Satakunta